Bridlewood Mall is a neighbourhood shopping centre in Toronto, Ontario, Canada. It serves the L'Amoreaux neighbourhood in the Scarborough district of Toronto. Its anchors include Shoppers Drug Mart, Dollarama, Metro, and Yours Food Mart.

History

Bridlewood Mall was built in 1975 and redeveloped from 1998 to 1999. The mall takes its name from Bridlewood area to the south and the horse farm owned by Harry C. Hatch from 1927 to 1946. A small cemetery from the mid-1800s was incorporated as a memorial garden in the parking lot. The mall began with four big-box store anchors: Towers, Kmart, Food City, and Dominion.

The Towers chain was bought by Zellers in 1990 and the store was closed in 1991.

Metro Inc. bought Dominion stores in December 2008, and the Dominion store was converted into a Metro store.

Zellers went into liquidation on December 26, 2012, and it closed in March 2013. During that time, Condos were proposed at the northern and southern sides of the mall, before being shelved by 2016.

A Target store was supposed to open at the location where the Zellers store had been (this space is small and it was said that it would be expanded), but all construction activity was cancelled due to Target's departure from Canada in April 2015. The space then became Stitches, a discount clothing outlet in 2016, before its closure in 2019. The space was then reopened on December 22, 2021, as an Asian supermarket (Yours Food Mart), with 2 stores within the store (Best Living, and Nana's Bakery).

Price Chopper closed on December 20, 2020, with the space being split in half. The western half was given to the City of Toronto, where an Employment and Social Services center has opened up at. Meanwhile, the other half is being leased to Toronto Public Library and will eventually move to  that space somewhere by 2023 or 2024, which will expand its current area from 7,590 sq ft to approx. 20,000 sq ft, accommodating more users and features.

Retail mix
The mall is a mix of small independent businesses, chain stores, a public library, a factory outlet and two grocery stores. The mall has a number of fast food restaurant locations.

References

External links

Shopping malls in Toronto
Buildings and structures in Scarborough, Toronto
Shopping malls established in 1975
1975 establishments in Ontario